The Select Society, established in 1754 as The St. Giles Society but soon renamed, was an intellectual society in 18th century Edinburgh. The society was first a discussion club then shortly thereafter a debating club for the intellectual elite of Edinburgh.

History

The Select Society initially had fifteen members who included:
 James Adam
 John Adam
 James Burnett, Lord Monboddo
 George Drummond
 Adam Ferguson
 Francis Home
 Henry Home, Lord Kames
 David Hume
 John Monro  
Alexander Monro primus
 Allan Ramsay
 William Robertson
 Adam Smith

By the end of its first year, The Select Society had eighty three members.  Some years later, some of the members established The Poker Club.

Their mission was articulated in The Scots Magazine in 1755: "The intention of these gentlemen was, by practice to improve themselves in reasoning and eloquence, and by the freedom of debate, to discover the most effectual methods of promoting the good of the country."

A member would pose a question for debate during the following meeting. Meetings were held on Wednesday nights from 6 PM to 9 PM 12 November – 12 August.

Membership

To become a member, one needed to be recommended in writing by two current members.  If more than one name was up for consideration, members voted and the majority name made it to the following meeting at which a vote of three-fourths was needed to confirm the membership.

Other Societies

In 1755 the Select Society founded a subsidiary body: the Edinburgh Society for Encouraging Arts, Sciences, Manufactures, and Agriculture in Scotland.

The society was not the only one of its kind in Edinburgh, with The Speculative Society performing a similar role.

Members of the society would go on to be involved with Edinburgh's convivial societies, such as The Poker Club.

See also
 Scottish Enlightenment
 The Speculative Society

References

Scottish Enlightenment
Learned societies of Scotland
Scotland articles needing attention
Organisations based in Edinburgh
Defunct organisations based in Scotland
Defunct learned societies of the United Kingdom
1754 establishments in Scotland
Organizations established in 1754
1764 disestablishments
Clubs and societies in Edinburgh